The Year of Spring: The Travel What Lasts a Year is a book written by Vyacheslav Vasilyevich Krasko, Russian traveler and member of the Union of the Russian Around-the-World Travelers, based on his yearlong journey around the world. In the book he shares thoughts, emotions, and impressions from the trip.

Critics are unable to place A Year of Spring into a particular genre. It is part novel, autobiography, travel guide book, and handbook of regional geography. Exotic landscapes descriptions, dialogues with locals and good memories all have their place in this travel story.

Krasko started writing his book in early 2010 and finished in 2011. It was completed in Sarankot – a small village near Pokhara, Nepal (located 5000 ft above sea level).

Plot

Vyacheslav Krasko tells his own story throughout the book. As an executive who reached financial independence and high status in society, he suddenly realizes hard principles and rationalism have displaced the most important things in life: happiness, freedom and true feelings.

To find the meaning of life, he breaks up with his sweetheart, moves house, leaves his job and buys a one-way ticket leaving Moscow. His new life has begun.

He starts his travel in the spring, a season symbolizing new beginnings.

Every day on Vyacheslav's journey is not like another. The splendor of ancient architecture is replaced by the beauty of virgin nature, small cities are interspersed with megacities, an instructive conversation with an Indian guru is adjacent to everyday troubles, and a new love for a wonderful girl turns into bitterness of disappointment – all this is the flow of life, its taste, which can be easily felt and hard to forget. Vyacheslav, like a little child, tastes everything and generously shares his new experience with readers. He learns to sail a yacht and catch a wave on a surf, cook intricate Chinese dishes and dance the Argentine tango, bungee jump over a stormy mountain river and climb the highest peaks.

Asia, Australia, South America, Antarctic, North America, Africa and finally Europe...

Each day of travel was different from the others. Splendid ancient architecture changed to wild nature, and cities alternated with small villages. The author tries one thing after another, like that of a child, and shares his thoughts and impressions with readers. One of the most important discoveries he makes is that a man doesn't have to live by others' ideals.

Will it be worth it to return to his old lifestyle? Day-to-day routine could absorb him again. He will not return.

He returned to Moscow, but he has not given up on his new ideas.

See also
 Travel
 Travel literature

References

Further reading

External links
 
 

2012 non-fiction books
Travelogues
Travel books
Travel autobiographies
Russian autobiographies